Romance on the Menu is a 2020 Australian romantic comedy film and the directorial debut of Rosie Lourde. It stars Tim Ross and Cindy Busby and was produced by The Steve Jaggi Company.

Plot 
Caroline, a chef in a swanky New York restaurant, discovers her Aunt Doreen has left her ownership of a cafe in Lemon Myrtle Cove, Australia. Leaving behind her job and ex-fiancé Nathaniel, Caroline finds that the Seagull Cafe is bustling and well-loved, and that she faces an offer to sell it. Initially wanting to sell, Caroline persuades the head chef Simon to help her fix up the place, only to soon realize that she really doesn't want to leave. Not only has she grown fond of the cafe and its customers, she has begun to fall in love with Simon. Eventually she must make a choice, particularly when Nathaniel starts pleading for them to get back together.

Cast
 Cindy Busby as Caroline Wilson
 Tim Ross as Simon Cook
 Naomi Sequeira as Beth
 Peter Bensley as Dale Whitely
 Marita Wilcox as Marla
 Barbara Bingham as Denise Wilson
 Perry Mooney as Molly
 Joey Vieira as Nathaniel
 Gavin Zimmermann as Alex the Waiter

Production 
Filming for Romance on the Menu took place in the Brisbane, Australia suburb of Shorncliffe over a period of three weeks during late 2019. The film's plot was initially intended to be set entirely in the United States, but was later shifted to Australia.

Release 
Romance On The Menu was released to Netflix Australia on 24 September 2020.

Reception 
Viva's Megan Wood praised the film, calling it "charming, relatable and beautifully shot, showcasing Australia’s famous coastline with laid-back ease."

References

External links
 

2020 films
2020 directorial debut films
Films shot in Brisbane
Australian romantic comedy films
English-language Netflix original films
2020 romantic comedy films
2020s English-language films